The John Bunn Award—in full, the John W. Bunn Lifetime Achievement Award—is an annual basketball award given by the Naismith Memorial Basketball Hall of Fame to an individual who has contributed significantly to the sport of basketball. Named after John Bunn, the first chairman of the Basketball Hall of Fame Committee from 1949 to 1969, the award is the highest and the most prestigious honor presented by the Basketball Hall of Fame other than enshrinement.

Honorees

References
General

Specific

External links
 John Bunn Award

Naismith Memorial Basketball Hall of Fame
Lists of basketball players in the United States
1973 establishments in the United States
American basketball trophies and awards
Lifetime achievement awards